The Emmanuel Episcopal Church in Rapid City, South Dakota is an historic Gothic Revival sandstone Episcopal church located at 717 Quincy Street.  In 1975, Emmanuel Church was added to the National Register of Historic Places.

It was built during 1887–88.  It is a one-story cross-gabled building.

History
Emmanuel Episcopal Church is the only downtown Rapid City church still in its original building. A small group began holding services in Rapid City in 1887, under the leadership of George G. Ware, a lay reader who was later ordained and became the first rector. The cornerstone of the original sandstone church was laid November 10, 1887, and the first services were held in the new building in 1888.

The church is listed on the National Register of Historic Places. The original church building was enlarged by an addition to the south in the early 1940s, which also incorporated a stone Parish Hall adjacent on the east. In 1954, a large, new Parish Hall with a stage, kitchen and basement classrooms was added and, in 1991, an addition for office space and additional classrooms was completed.

The longest-serving Rector was the Rev. Mr. E. Jerome Pipes, who served from 1934 until 1960. Perhaps the best-remembered event of his tenure was the attendance of President Franklin D. Roosevelt at a regular Sunday service in 1936.

Rectors have included the Rev. Dr. Hanford L. King, Jr. (later Bishop of Idaho), 1960–1972; the Rev. Mr. Hewes "Doc" Phillips, 1972–1977; the Rev. Mr. David Anderson, 1978–1987; The Rev. Mr. David A. Cameron, 1987–2006; interim rectors the Very Rev. Dr. Robert Wagner (2006) and the Rev. Canon David L. Seger (2006-2008); Rev. Richard Ressler, (2008–2013); the Rev. Chris Roussell (2013–2019); and the Rev. John David Barnes (2020–present).

Current use
Emmanuel Church is an active parish in the Episcopal Diocese of South Dakota.

See also

 List of Registered Historic Places in South Dakota
 Emmanuel Episcopal Church (disambiguation)

References

External links
 Emmanuel Episcopal Church website

Churches on the National Register of Historic Places in South Dakota
Episcopal churches in South Dakota
Churches in Pennington County, South Dakota
Gothic Revival church buildings in South Dakota
Buildings and structures in Rapid City, South Dakota
National Register of Historic Places in Pennington County, South Dakota
1888 establishments in Dakota Territory